Sanjaymama Vittalrao Shinde is a member of the Maharashtra Legislative Assembly elected from Karmala Assembly constituency in Solapur city. He is an independent.

Positions held
 2019: Elected to Maharashtra Legislative Assembly.

References

Living people
Year of birth missing (living people)
Maharashtra MLAs 2019–2024
People from Solapur